David La Touche may refer to:

 David Digges La Touche (1671–1745), soldier, businessman and banker
 David La Touche (1703–1785), banker
 David La Touche (1729–1817), Irish MP for Dundalk, Longford, Belturbet and Newcastle
 David La Touche (1768–1816), Irish MP for Newcastle and County Carlow